Delfini may refer to:

 Delfini (family), an Italian noble family
 Delfini (Split band), a Yugoslav rock and pop band from Split
 Delfini (Zagreb band), a Yugoslav rock band from Zagreb
 , a Greek fishing vessel in service 1962–72